John Simon Bintcliffe (born 7 February 1966 in Bridlington, East Riding of Yorkshire, England) is a motor racing figure. He has been involved in the British Touring Car Championship as both driver and team owner.

He won the Renault Clio Cup in 1994, and the Ford Credit Fiesta series a year later.

He competed in the British Touring Car Championship for Audi from 1996 to 1998, teamed with series champions Frank Biela and Yvan Muller. Due to its Quattro 4-wheel drive system, Audi initially had the best car, and despite his lack of experience John was able to twice finish 7th in the championship, taking 2 race wins against many higher profile drivers. However, the team struggled in 1998, and John was 15th overall, only just ahead of independent champion Tommy Rustad. This may be an unfair reflection on John, given teammate Muller's success; in the same year Frank Biela only mustered 14th place in the German equivalent series, using the same 2-wheel drive Audi.

He is the team manager for the Bintcliffe Sport team, based on the Barr Lane estate in York . Having run Paul O'Neill in the MGF Cup, they raced in the BTCC's Class B in 2000 (with Rob Collard among their drivers), and the equivalent Production Class in 2001. They also ran Jason Plato and Darren Manning in ASCAR.

John returned to racing in 2011 racing in an Audi R8 LMS in the British GT championship for United Autosports.

Bintcliffe is now director of Donotbend Ltd., a designer furniture outlet based in Minskip near York.

Racing record

Complete British Touring Car Championship results
(key) (Races in bold indicate pole position – 1 point awarded all races) (Races in italics indicate fastest lap) (* signifies that driver lead feature race for at least one lap – 1 point awarded 1998 only)

Complete British GT Championship results
(key) (Races in bold indicate pole position in class) (Races in italics indicate fastest lap in class)

References 

Profile at BTCCPages

1966 births
Living people
British Touring Car Championship drivers
People from Bridlington
English racing drivers
British GT Championship drivers
Sportspeople from Yorkshire
Renault UK Clio Cup drivers
Audi Sport drivers
United Autosports drivers